Amar Kutir (আমার কুটির) (meaning: my cottage), once a place of refuge for independence movement activists has been turned into a cooperative society for the promotion of arts and crafts.

History

Early years
In 1922, on an invitation from Rabindranath Tagore, Mohandas Karamchand Gandhi, just released after imprisonment for political activities, visited Santiniketan. Sushen Mukherjee, a young man, met him there. Mukherjee had been associated with the revolutionary movement for Indian independence for some years. His meeting with Gandhi led to the setting up of Amar Kutir in 1927.

Sushen Mukherjee, the founder of Amar Kutir was born late in the eighteenth century, hailing from a remote suburb of Calcutta City, in youth, imbibed with Ramakrishna Vedanta Culture and ideology wandered vehemently to find an answer to query "What is the purpose of life!” Out of this yearning he moved around criss-cross all over India and even traveled to distant Tibet like a wandering monk. During this period of churning invocation, perhaps, he realized that one's first and foremost purpose of life should be "to free yourself from the bondage of foreign rule". Provoked by this self-esteemed ideology and compulsion, together with the then under current of freedom movement spearheaded by none, other than Mahatma Gandhi, Netaji Subhas Chandra Bose, Ballav Bhai Patel et al., all those first ranked Indian Freedom fighters, he plunged himself into the freedom movement of India. He met Mahatma Gandhi, Subhas Bose et al. when the movement was at its zenith.

At this juncture his thought veered round the idea as to how, so many young and youthful boys being involved in freedom movement, would help maintain their day to day living. Because, most of them are fugitives and obviously were out of their families. His idea was to find a haven which would be remote, human inhabitant free, preferably in the midst of woods to hoodwink cudgels and piercing eyes of ever alert British Police and work on where they could work on sari printing, handloom and leather craft production.. It happened to be not very far from Bolepur, Shantiniketan, of today. Then he gradually established the rudiments of cottage industry. And he named the place 'Amar Kutir' (my abode).

In 1930, Amar Kutir was raided by the British rulers and Mukherjee was put behind bars for political activities. With Mukherjee behind bars until 1937, the activities of Amar Kutir came to a halt.

Mistaken attribution to Tagore

Tagore set up the Institute of Rural Reconstruction at Sriniketan in 1922.

The second but contiguous campus of Visva Bharati was subsequently located around the same place in 1923. It carried on the craft training work started by Silpa Bhavana at Santiniketan. The first cooperative for rural reconstruction was set up at Sriniketan in 1925. Though the above society was situated in the close reach of Rabindranath Tagores's land of Viswa Bharti, never did Tagore ever visit Amar Kutir nor did Amar Kutir receive any attribution from Tagore's land of Shantiniketan.

Revolutionaries and Village Craft
During his spare time Sushen Mukherjee – the time when he used to be free from his main freedom fighting activities which he held as his real pre-occupation – used to earn resources from door to door selling of quality tea, uncommon fancy materials and antiques etc. among the nobles, well-wishers and 'well to do' members of society. Or else, he would travel to Bombay, Madras to find avenues of earning revenue for the establishment he so fondly founded in Amar Kutir. Thus he came across different shades of people. Bottom line being, that was how he learned the tricks and trades of waxing, cracking and printing, hitherto popularly known as Batik Print on fancy leather goods such as ladies' handbags, purses, brief-cases, side bags etc. He was the pioneer in this type of artifices trading and which, of course, he mastered through intermingling with traders visiting India from Malayasia, Indonesia in the late thirties and early forties. This itself is a history. During his years in prison Mukherjee met several revolutionary leaders, notably Moni Ganguly and Panna Lal Dasgupta. The prisons of British authorities were at that time hot beds of Marxist discussion and training. From 1938 when the British government relaxed its rules and started releasing many of the revolutionaries from prison, they started living and working in Amar Kutir.
They were instrumental in organizing night classes and spreading Marxist ideas amongst the rural masses. When the Second World War broke out in 1939, many of the revolutionaries left Amar Kutir and were directly involved in organizing peasant movement in the villages. Many of them were active during the Quit India movement in 1942. Tarapada and Jata Majhi of Rupur Samaya Sadan died in police firing in a raid on Bolpur Railway Station conducted by thousands of people assembled by Amar Kutir.

Post-independence years

After India gained independence from the British, Amar Kutir became a cooperative to rejuvenate and develop rural handicrafts, reflecting the ideals of self–help and sustainable rural development advocated by Tagore. Amar Kutir Society for Rural Development was formally registered in 1978.
Sushen Mukherjee during his lifetime came to know so many boys, perhaps hundreds, but he took fancy of only two of them, the two brothers, Kamalaksha Bose and Alok Bose. He knew at his heart of hearts that only these two brothers, devoid of lust for fame, fortune, greed etc. would be his worthy successors and would be able to carry the mantle of his selfless work and would help maintain the legacy which he (Sushen Mukehrjee), throughout his lifetime held dearly so close to his heart. In pursuant to this compulsion he adopted the two brothers as his sons and installed them the true inheritors of the above property bu one deed of conveyance. After the demise of respected Sushen Mukherjee, Kamalaksha Bose and Alok Bose took up the cajoles of running the activities of Amar Kutir with so much of dedication in a most selfless way, never believing in self-populist propaganda etc. The Bose brothers always kept themselves away from the limelight and shied away from the humdrums of populist self-trumpeting act for fame and so called honour. Out of passion or ideal one great soul founded one organisation but to veer it towards the rightful destiny needs yet an equally astute mind and a gigantic heart to reverberate one small creation into a much bigger centre for multifarious activities. They ran it from 1955 to 1978/ 1980. Ultimately, they had managed to help transfer this property to create an autonomous body known as Amar Kutir Society for Rural Development and gifted the property to this society. Thus it became a self-sufficient organisation which is benefiting the local population. Local people bring their merchandises such as needle works, leather handicrafts etc. local people bring their merchandises such as needle works, leather handicrafts etc. and sell them to the above society who in turn sell them to the tourists visiting the society or export them to foreign countries.

Activities
Amar Kutir is a cooperative unit that produces leather goods, kantha stitched saris, bamboo crafts and batik at a reasonable price. Its leather-craft unit employs mostly women. It has one batik, a needlecraft unit and shola and lac crafts units. Under a Central government scheme, a craft development centre was opened in 1992 at Amar Kutir. In 1993, the Central government set up a hand-block printing training centre at Amar Kutir Complex. Kantha-stitch sarees made here cater to the demands in both national and international markets.

References

External links 
Official Website 
Official Shopping Website   
 

Birbhum district
Cooperatives in India